The 2021 Canberra Raiders season was the 41st in the club's history. Coached by Ricky Stuart and captained jointly by Jarrod Croker, Josh Hodgson and Elliott Whitehead, they competed in the 2021 NRL season, placing 10th out of 16 teams and thus failing to make the finals.

Season summary 
Canberra looked to capitalise on their successful 2020 campaign, however they fell apart mid-season from heavy losses to other teams such as the Penrith Panthers and South Sydney Rabbitohs, losing five games in a row and being demolished by underdogs the Gold Coast Titans. Rumours of a player-coach riff between Stuart and a certain amount of players led to the stand-down of Josh Hodgson as captain and the departure of English import George Williams. Due to the COVID-19 pandemic, the NRL relocated to Queensland to play the rest of the season. This was further setback with the lockdown in Brisbane and 11 other LGAs in June. Multiple injuries to players such as youngster Xavier Savage and hooker Tom Starling threatened to derail their season, but they were successful in gaining wins in the second half of the year, with defeats of Manly, Cronulla and Parramatta successively. They came close to reaching the top eight, however a loss to the Roosters in Round 25 sealed their fate.

Results

Ladder

2021 Squad

Transfers 
Losses:

Gains:

2021 Meninga Medal Award Winners
NSW Cup Player of the Year – Kai O’Donnell

NSW Cup Coaches Award – Matt Frawley

Geoff Caldwell Welfare & Education Award – Elliott Whitehead

Gordon McLucas Memorial Junior Representative Player of the Year - Trey Mooney

Fred Daly Memorial Club Person of the Year – Grant Hogan

NRL Rookie of the Year – Harley Smith-Shields & Matt Timoko

NRL Coaches Award – Tom Starling

Meninga Medal – Jordan Rapana

References 

Canberra Raiders seasons
Canberra Raiders season